A presidential election was held in Honduras on 18 December 1939.

"On 12 December 1939, a group of five deputies presented a proposal to Congress suggesting that article 202 be reformed to allow the president Tiburcio Carías Andino and vice-president to remain in power until 1 January 1949.  By Decree 16 on 18 December 1939, this proposal was unanimously adopted".

References

Bibliography

Euraque, Darío A. Reinterpreting the banana republic: region and state in Honduras, 1870–1972. Chapel Hill: The University of North Carolina Press. 1996.

Krehm, William. Democracia y tiranias en el Caribe. Buenos Aires: Editorial Parnaso. (First edition in 1947). 1957.

Political handbook of the world 1940. New York, 1941.

Stokes, William S. Honduras: an area study in government. Madison: University of Wisconsin Press. 1950.

1939
1939 elections in Central America
1939 in Honduras
December 1939 events